Anidorus is a genus of beetles belonging to the family Aderidae.

The genus was first described by Mulsant and Rey in 1866.

The species of this genus are found in Europe.

Species:

References

Aderidae